Colonic ulcer can occur at any age, in children however they are rare. Most common symptoms are abdominal pain and hematochezia.

See also
 Large intestine

References

Further reading
 

Abdominal pain